Shall We Go on Sinning So That Grace May Increase? is a studio album by American musician Drew Daniel, under his experimental side project The Soft Pink Truth. It was released on May 1, 2020 under Thrill Jockey.

Critical reception
Shall We Go on Sinning So That Grace May Increase? was met with universal acclaim reviews from critics. At Metacritic, which assigns a weighted average rating out of 100 to reviews from mainstream publications, this release received an average score of 87 based on eight reviews.

Concluding the review for AllMusic, Heather Phares wrote "While it's just as thought-provoking as the Soft Pink Truth's other albums, there's something magical in how the emotional dimensions and deep beauty of Shall We Go on Sinning So That Grace May Increase? reaffirm that positivity and creativity are the most powerful weapons against hate and darkness."

Accolades

Track listing

References

2020 albums
The Soft Pink Truth albums
Thrill Jockey albums